A rowing tank is an indoor facility which attempts to mimic the conditions rowers face on open water.

Rowers sit in fixed rowing positions, with a channel of water to either side of the 'boat'. Older tanks used the power of the athlete to circulate water. This experience is unrealistic, and the rowing stroke is not accurately reproduced. Modern tanks move the water past the rowers, simulating the feel of rowing a boat through open water.

Rowing tanks are primarily used for off-season rowing, muscle specific conditioning and technique training, or simply when bad weather does not allow for open water training. A tank allows basic technique to be taught to newcomers to the sport in a safe environment, and enables coaches to work on the technique of more experienced oarsmen.

See also
Rowbike
Rowing
Indoor rower

References

Rowing equipment